Tanarupi (pronounced tānarūpi, meaning the one that embodies tanam) is a rāgam in Carnatic music (musical scale of South Indian classical music). It is the 6th melakarta rāgam in the 72 melakarta rāgam system of Carnatic music. It is called Tanukeerti in Muthuswami Dikshitar school of Carnatic music.

Structure and Lakshana

It is the 6th rāgam in the 1st chakra Indu. The mnemonic name is Indu-Sha. The mnemonic phrase is sa ra ga ma pa dhu nu. Its  structure (ascending and descending scale) is as follows (see swaras in Carnatic music for details on below notation and terms):
: 
: 

The notes used in this scale are shuddha rishabham, shuddha gandharam, shuddha madhyamam, shatsruthi dhaivatham and kakali nishadham. As it is a melakarta rāgam, by definition it is a sampoorna rāgam (has all seven notes in ascending and descending scale). It is the shuddha madhyamam equivalent of Raghupriya, which is the 42nd melakarta rāgam.

Asampurna Melakarta 
Tanukeerti is the 6th Melakarta in the original list compiled by Venkatamakhin. The notes used in the scale are the same, but the ascending scale and descending scale are different. It is an audava-vakra sampurna raga (5 notes in ascending scale, while full 7 are used in descending scale in a zig-zag manner).
: 
:

Janya rāgams 
Tanarupi has no janya rāgams (derived scales) associated with it. See List of janya rāgams for a full list of janya rāgams.

Compositions
Here are a few common compositions sung in concerts, set to Tanarupi.
Va velava va by Koteeswara Iyer
Sri Ramam sada bajeham by Dr. M. Balamuralikrishna

The following composition is set to Tanukeerti.
Chidambara natarajamurthim by Muthuswami Dikshitar

Related rāgams
This section covers the theoretical and scientific aspect of this rāgam.

Tanarupi's notes when shifted using Graha bhedam, yields no other melakarta rāgam. Graha bhedam is the step taken in keeping the relative note frequencies same, while shifting the shadjam to the next note in the rāgam.

Notes

References

Melakarta ragas